Madison Square–West Main Street Historic District is a national historic district located in the Susan B. Anthony Neighborhood of Rochester in Monroe County, New York. The district consists of 102 contributing structures and two contributing sites.  Sixty five of the contributing structures are residential, with three contributing dependencies.  Also in the district are 24 contributing commercial buildings and nine industrial buildings.  The two sites are Susan B. Anthony Square and a former carriage company storage yard. Located within the district boundaries is the separately listed Susan B. Anthony House.

It was listed on the National Register of Historic Places in 1988.

See also
National Register of Historic Places listings in Rochester, New York

References

Historic districts in Rochester, New York
Historic districts on the National Register of Historic Places in New York (state)
National Register of Historic Places in Rochester, New York